Earl "the Twirl" Williams (born March 24, 1951) is an American-Israeli former professional basketball player who 
in 1990 and 1991 was the top rebounder in the Israel Basketball Premier League.

Early life and education
Williams played high school basketball while attending Woodrow Wilson High School in Levittown, Pennsylvania. He played college basketball at Winston-Salem State University, with the Winston-Salem State Rams.

Professional career

United States
In the 1974 NBA draft, Williams was selected by the Phoenix Suns in the 3rd round, with the 13th pick (49th overall). He made his NBA debut on October 17, 1974, with Phoenix. During the next four years, he played for other NBA teams as well: the Detroit Pistons, the New York Nets, and the Boston Celtics. On September 30, 1975, he was traded by the Suns to the Detroit Pistons, for a 1976 2nd round draft pick (Earl Tatum).

Sweden
In the 1977–78 season, Williams played for the Swedish League team Alvik.  Alvik came in 2nd in the league that year.

Israel
Williams later played professionally in the Israeli League. He starred for a portion of the time with Maccabi Tel Aviv and Hapoel Holon, and he also played with Maccabi Ramat Gan. In 1990, at age 39, he was the oldest player in the Israeli League. In 1990 and 1991 he was the top rebounder in the Israel Basketball Premier League.

Italy
Williams played two seasons for Italian teams as well: Fortitudo Bologna in 1984–1985, and Libertas Brindisi in 1988–1989.

Personal life
In 1982, Williams converted to Judaism.  Williams also became a naturalized Israeli citizen, becoming a dual US-Israeli citizen.

After ending his active player career at the age of 43, Williams worked as an educator and basketball coach in New Jersey.

He is married to Merav, who is originally from Israel. They have two children.

References

External links
Williams' NBA stats at basketballreference.com

1951 births
Living people
African-American basketball players
African-American Jews
American expatriate basketball people in Israel
American expatriate basketball people in Italy
American expatriate basketball people in Sweden
American men's basketball players
Basketball players from Pennsylvania
Bnei Hertzeliya basketball players
Boston Celtics players
Centers (basketball)
Converts to Judaism from Methodism
Detroit Pistons players
Fortitudo Pallacanestro Bologna players
Hapoel Holon players
Israeli American
Israeli men's basketball players
Jewish men's basketball players
Jewish Israeli sportspeople
Maccabi Tel Aviv B.C. players
Naturalized citizens of Israel
New York Nets players
People from Levittown, Pennsylvania
Phoenix Suns draft picks
Phoenix Suns players
Sportspeople from Bucks County, Pennsylvania
Winston-Salem State Rams men's basketball players
Alviks BK players
21st-century African-American people
20th-century African-American sportspeople